Nizhneye Inkhelo is a rural locality (a selo) in Botlikhsky District, Republic of Dagestan, Russia. The population was 2,113 as of 2010. There are 17 streets.

Geography 
Nizhneye Inkhelo is located 3 km east of Botlikh (the district's administrative centre) by road, on the right bank of the Andiyskoye Koysu River. Botlikh is the nearest rural locality.

References 

Rural localities in Botlikhsky District